The Golden Nile Catfish, Chrysichthys auratus is a species of fish belonging to the family Claroteidae.

The species is found in Africa.

The fish is widespread and is known from most of the West African hydrographic basins, except in the coastal areas between Gambia and Liberia, where it is replaced by Chrysichthys maurus. It is also present from southern Liberia to Cabinda in Angola, and widespread throughout Lower Guinea. It is also reported from the Chad and Nile.

Size
The fish can get as large as

References

Risch, L.M., 2003. Claroteidae. p. 60-96 In C. Lévêque, D. Paugy and G.G. Teugels (eds.) Faune des poissons d'eaux douce et saumâtres de l'Afrique de l'Ouest, Tome 2. Coll. Faune et Flore tropicales 40. Musée Royal de l'Afrique Centrale, Tervuren, Belgique, Museum National d'Histoire Naturalle, Paris, France and Institut de Recherche pour le Développement, Paris, France. 815 p. 

Claroteidae
Taxa named by Étienne Geoffroy Saint-Hilaire